Heimstetten station is a railway station in Heimstetten in the municipality of Kirchheim bei München, located in the Munich district in Bavaria, Germany.

References

Railway stations in Bavaria
Munich S-Bahn stations
Buildings and structures in Munich (district)
Railway stations in Germany opened in 1897
1897 establishments in Bavaria